The Kingdom of Norway is home to several species of reptiles and amphibians, despite its cold climate.

Reptiles

Amphibians

References

R
Reptiles
Norway
Norway
Norway
Norway